Caseoides is an extinct genus of large caseid synapsids that lived in the Kungurian Age (late Early Permian epoch). Its fossils were found in San Angelo Formation, Texas. Caseoides was very similar to Casea, but was slightly larger in size. Caseoides was a heavily built creature, as are most of the Caseids (except Caseopsis). In the development of its proportionally thick, stout limbs it represents the culmination of the Casea lineage. Its relatives became smaller in size during the Roadian Age. Only poorly preserved postcranial material is known including limbs.

See also
 List of pelycosaurs
 Caseopsis - a relative of Caseoides, they lived side by side in Texas, but Caseopsis was lightly built, unlike Caseoides
 Casea - another relative, only smaller in size, but Casoides and Casea were very similar in body shape

References

Caseasaurs
Prehistoric synapsid genera
Cisuralian synapsids of North America
Taxa named by Everett C. Olson
Fossil taxa described in 1953
Kungurian genus first appearances
Kungurian genus extinctions